Peipsiveere Nature Reserve is a nature reserve in Tartu County, Estonia, located around the estuary of the Emajõgi River, on the southwestern coast of Lake Peipus.

Peipsiveere Nature Reserve was established in 2013 by combining Piirissaare, Emajõe and Emajõe-Suursoo protected areas.

References

Nature reserves in Estonia
Geography of Tartu County
Protected areas established in 2013
2013 establishments in Estonia
Ramsar sites in Estonia